The PFL 7 mixed martial arts event for the 2018 season of the Professional Fighters League was held on August 30, 2018, at the Ocean Resort Casino in Atlantic City, New Jersey. It was the seventh and final regular season event of 2018 before the playoffs.

Background
Lightweight's Brian Foster and Ramsey Nijem were expected to fight on this card, however both were ruled out of the tournament when Foster was unable to get licensed by the New Jersey athletic commission, and Nijem was unable to gain clearance from a medical suspension. As a result, Johnny Case vs. Jason High was made, with the winner determining the 155 divisions final playoff participant.
On weigh in day however, the substitute fight had its own set back, as High missed the weight limit by 4.2 pounds, and the bout was scratched from the card all together. As a result, Case was awarded 3 points via walkover victory.

Results

Standings after event
The point system consists of outcome based scoring and bonuses for an early win. Under the outcome based scoring system, the winner of a fight receives 3 points and the loser receives 0 points. If the fight ends in a draw, both fighters will receive 1 point. The bonus for winning a fight in the first, second, or third round is 3 points, 2 points, and 1 point respectively. For example, if a fighter wins a fight in the first round, then the fighter will receive 6 total points. If a fighter misses weight, then the fighter that missed weight will receive 0 points and his opponent will receive 3 points due to a walkover victory.

Featherweight

Lightweight

Welterweight

Middleweight

Light Heavyweight

Heavyweight

♛ = Clinched playoff spot ---
🚫 = Ruled out ---
E = Eliminated

NOTE:  Prior to PFL 8, which started the PFL playoff, Valdrin Istrefi was ruled out because of an injury.  Caio Alencar was declared the first alternate and participated in the playoff.

See also
List of PFL events
List of current PFL fighters

References

Professional Fighters League
2018 in mixed martial arts
Sports in Atlantic City, New Jersey
Mixed martial arts in New Jersey
2018 in sports in New Jersey
August 2018 sports events in the United States